Major General Henry Spencer Palmer (30 April 1838 – 10 February 1893) was a British Army military engineer and surveyor, noted for his work in developing Yokohama harbor in the Empire of Japan as a foreign advisor to the Japanese government

Biography

Palmer was born at Bangalore, British India; his father was a colonel in the Madras army.  He was educated at private schools in Bath in England and by tutors before being admitted in January 1856 to the Royal Military Academy, Woolwich. He was commissioned as a lieutenant in the Royal Engineers in December and studied for a year at the Royal Engineers Establishment, Chatham. In October 1858, he was assigned to British Columbia, Canada as part of a survey mission. In addition to undertaking several exploratory surveys, he laid out trails, supervised road construction, and inspected road-works. He was commended for his efforts, and during his stay in Canada also contributed papers on British Columbia to the Royal Geographical Society in London. In November 1863, one month after their marriage, he and his 15-year-old wife, Canadian Mary Jane Pearson, the daughter of a Canadian archdeacon, (17 January 1848 – 10 January 1934) sailed for England.

From 1864 and 1874 Palmer served with the Ordnance Survey of Great Britain. Palmer was well known not only as a soldier but also as a scientist. From 1874, he undertook various postings as a surveyor, civil engineer, and astronomer in New Zealand, Barbados, Hong Kong, and Japan. At some point before Palmer headed out for Japan, he and his wife parted.  She returned to her native British Columbia where she lived for the rest of her life.

After retiring from the Royal Engineers in 1887, he settled in Japan, established a successful civilian practice in Yokohama, where he was hired by the Japanese government to develop designs for the harbor, Ōsanbashi Pier and the city waterworks. He was also a frequent contributor of letters and articles to the Japan Times, Japan Weekly Mail and other newspapers and periodicals, and was also a correspondent for the London Times. He also wrote a profusely illustrated guidebook to Japan, "Letters from the Land of the Rising Sun".

At some point around 1890, he remarried to a Japanese woman, Uta Saito, with whom he had a daughter.

After his death in 1893 from typhoid fever, he was buried at the Aoyama Cemetery in Tokyo.

A bronze bust of Palmer was unveiled by the Yokohama Water Works in 1987 to commemorate the centennial of its foundation. The Yokohama Archives of History also held a special exhibition in his honor the same year.

See also 
 Anglo-Japanese relations
 O-yatoi gaikokujin

References 

 'Henry Spencer Palmer, 1838-93', by Jiro Higuchi, Chapter 18, Britain & Japan: Biographical Portraits, Volume IV, edited by Hugh Cortazzi, Japan Library, 2002

External links 
 Biography at the Dictionary of Canadian Biography Online
 Online Museum with much detailed information

1838 births
1893 deaths
Foreign advisors to the government in Meiji-period Japan
British expatriates in Japan
Graduates of the Royal Military Academy, Woolwich
British explorers of North America
Explorers of British Columbia
Royal Engineers officers
Pre-Confederation British Columbia people
Deaths from typhoid fever
British Army generals
Burials in Japan